is a Japanese ice dancer. Competing with Hiroyuki Suzuki (her husband), she placed 18th in the 1988 Winter Olympic Games.  She was a three-time Japanese National Champion.

Competitive highlights

See also 
Figure skating at the 1988 Winter Olympics

References

1958 births
Living people
Japanese female ice dancers
Olympic figure skaters of Japan
Figure skaters at the 1988 Winter Olympics